William Walker Rae (16 June 1924 – 1982) was a Scottish footballer who played in the 1940s and 1950s. Rae played junior football for Petershill before joining Rangers in 1945. He played in 131 league matches for Rangers before moving to Queen of the South in 1956.

Rae died in New Kilpatrick in 1982, at the age of 57.

References

1924 births
1982 deaths
Petershill F.C. players
Scottish Football League players
Queen of the South F.C. players
Rangers F.C. players
Scottish footballers
Association football wing halves
Footballers from Glasgow